Nepal–Switzerland relations refers to bilateral foreign relations between Nepal and Switzerland.

Nepal–Switzerland relations were officially established on 10 November 1956.

References

External links
 

 
Switzerland
Nepal